Horse with a Heart is the first studio album by Altan, released in May 1989 on the Green Linnet Records label.

Track listing

All titles arranged by Altan.

 "The Curlew/McDermott's/Three Scones of Boxty/Unnamed Reel {= McConnell's}" – 4:11
 "The Lass of Glenshee" – 4:38
 "Con Cassidy's & Neil Gow's Highlands/Moll and Tiarna/Mcsweeney's Reels" – 4:27
 "The Road to Durham" – 3:21
 "An t-Oileán Úr" – 2:33
 "An Grianán/Horse With a Heart" – 3:01
 "A Bhean Udaí Thall" – 3:28
 "Welcome Home Gráinne/Con McGinley's" – 3:18
 "Tuirse Mo Chroí" – 4:06
 "Come Ye by Atholl/Kitty O'Connor" – 3:11
 "An Feochán" – 4:45
 "Paddy's Trip to Scotland/Dinky's/The Shetland Fiddler" – 4:47

All titles are traditional, except the following:
"An Grianán" and "Horse with a Heart" – composed by Frankie Kennedy
"The Curlew" – composed by Josephine Keegan
"McDermott's" – composed by Josie McDermott
"An Feochán" – composed by Tommy Peoples
"The Road to Durham" – composed by Armin Barnett and David Molk

See tune identifications for this album at irishtune.info.

Personnel

Altan
Mairéad Ní Mhaonaigh – Fiddle, Vocals
Frankie Kennedy – Flute
Paul O'Shaughnessy — Fiddle
Ciarán Curran – Bouzouki
Mark Kelly – Guitar

Guest musicians
Marie Askin – Piano on "The Lass of Glenshee"
Phil Cunningham – Keyboard, Whistle
Dónal Lunny – Bass Bodhrán on "A Bhean Udaí Thall"
Colm Murphy – Bodhrán
Steve White – Percussion on "A Bhean Udaí Thall"

Production
Phil Cunningham – Producer
Dan Fitzgerald – Engineer
John W. Davis – Assistant Engineer
Stephen Byram – Design
Ross Wilson – Artwork
Dave Harrold - Back cover photograph

References

Altan (band) albums
1989 albums